UK + Europe 2023 is the upcoming 15th concert tour by American rock band Maroon 5, in support of their seventh studio album, Jordi (2021). It is scheduled to begin on June 13, 2023, in Lisbon and conclude on July 4, 2023, in Birmingham.

Tour dates

References

Notes

Citations 

2023 concert tours
Maroon 5 concert tours